Myrna May Combellack is a British academic researcher and writer of the Institute of Cornish Studies (in the Charles Thomas era), translator of Beunans Meriasek and author of several works of fiction.

Early life
She graduated in English from the University of York in 1971.

Doctoral thesis
"A Critical Edition of Beunans Meriasek" (PhD thesis, University of Exeter, 1985)

Publications

Academic work
1974: A Survey of Musical Activities in Cornwall (Series: Special reports; no.1). Redruth: Institute of Cornish Studies 
1988: The Camborne Play. Redruth: Dyllansow Truran  (translation in verse of Beunans Meriasek)

Fiction
1989: The Playing Place. Redruth: Dyllansow Truran  (novel)
2002: A Fine Place: the Cornish estate. Cornish Fiction 
2003: The Permanent History of Penaluna's Van. Cornish Fiction 
2004: Cuts in the Face: stories from Cornwall. Cornish Fiction 
2005: The Mistress of Grammar [and] Niobe's Tears. Cornish Fiction  (novella and short story; "Niobe's tears" was first published in The new quarterly cave; v. 2, no. 4, 1977)
2007: A Place to Stay: the Cornish bypass (Playing Place series). Cornish Fiction

References and notes

Education in Cornwall
Academics of the University of Exeter
Living people
20th-century English novelists
21st-century English novelists
Alumni of the University of York
Novelists from Cornwall
English women novelists
Vassar College alumni
21st-century English women writers
20th-century English women writers
Year of birth missing (living people)